Khreshchatyk is the main street of Kyiv, Ukraine. It stretches from the European Square (northeast) through the Maidan and to Bessarabska Square (southwest) where the Besarabsky Market is located. Along the street are the offices of the Kyiv City Council which contains both the city's council and the state administration, the Main Post Office, the Ministry of Agrarian Policy, the State Committee of Television and Radio Broadcasting, the Central Department Store (TsUM), the Ukrainian House, and others.

The entire street was completely destroyed during World War II by the retreating Red Army troops and rebuilt in the neo-classical style of post-war Stalinist architecture. Among prominent buildings that did not survive were the Kyiv City Duma, the Kyiv Stock Exchange, Hotel Natsional, and the Ginzburg House. The street has been significantly renovated during the modern period of Ukraine's independence. Today, the street is still significant to administrative and business city organizations, as well as a popular tourist attraction.

As of 2010, Khreshchatyk is included in the Top 20 of most expensive shopping streets in Europe.

History
The name of Khreshchatyk is believed to be derived from the Slavic word krest or khrest (cross). It lies in a valley that is crossed by several ravines. When looked at from above, the valley resembles a cross. A small river, the Khreshchatyk River, a tributary of Kyiv's Lybid River, ran along much of the valley, and still runs underground along much of the street.

Russian Empire
For a long time, Khreshchatyk remained an undeveloped ravine between several neighborhoods of Kyiv: Podil – the commercial neighbourhood, the Upper City – the administrative neighbourhood, and Pechersk neighbourhood built around the Pechersk Lavra ("Monastery of the Caves").

The development of the area only started in the 19th century. The ravine was filled and accelerating construction quickly followed. By the middle 19th century, Khreshchatyk was developed as Kyiv's main thoroughfare in the climate of rapid growth of the city during the Industrial Revolution in Imperial Russia. The street soon became the center of Kyiv's commercial life, as the city itself developed into the main commercial center in the Empire's south-west.

In 1892, the first electric tram line in the Russian Empire ran in Kyiv and by 1894, the line was extended to Khreshchatyk. The street was served by the tram for about 40 years.

Revolution
During the period of chaos after the Russian Revolution of 1917, many buildings on Khreshchatyk were heavily damaged as the city changed hands many times between Ukrainian, German, Polish, and Russian Bolshevik forces. On 9 May 1920, the Polish army under General Rydz-Smigly celebrated their capture of Kyiv by a ceremonial parade on Khreshchatyk. They were driven out by the Russian Bolshevik counter-offensive within weeks.

Interbellum

Between the wars, Khreshchatyk underwent major development and reconstruction. Between 1923 and 1937, the street was named after V.V. Vorovsky, an early Bolshevik diplomat assassinated in Switzerland. In the mid-1930s, the tram lines were deconstructed, and the trams replaced by trolleybuses.

World War II
During World War II, almost every building on the street was mined with explosives by the retreating Red Army troops. In September 1941, after German troops occupied the city, explosions were set off by radio-controlled fuses from over 400 kilometres away. The demolition of over three hundred buildings on Khreshchatyk became the first operation in history where the long-distance radio-controlled explosions were used for military purposes. Much of the surviving historic center of Kyiv was demolished by Soviet authorities after the war. This unprecedented method of warfare caused panic and brought heavy casualties among both the occupiers and city's remaining civilian population.

Under German occupation, the street was renamed Eichhornstrasse, after the German World War I Field Marshal Hermann von Eichhorn supreme commander of Army Group Kyiv (Heeresgruppe Kiew) and simultaneously military governor of Ukraine during the previous German occupation, who had been assassinated on the Khreshchatyk road in Kyiv by the social revolutionary Boris Donskoi in 1918.

Soviet Ukraine

Following the war, Khreshchatyk was rebuilt in the 1950s and 1960s. The street was widened to 75–100 meters and new buildings were erected in the Neoclassical Stalinist architectural style. Important buildings of the new ensemble include the City Council House (Kyivrada), the Central Post Office (Poshtamt) and Trade-Union House (Budynok Profspilok).

It was used for demonstrations and parades in honor of 1 May (until 1969), Victory Day (9 May) and the October Revolution.

The street was one of Kyiv's first landmarks that was serviced by the Kyiv Metro in 1960, (see Khreshchatyk (Kyiv Metro)) and was the system's first transfer station when the second line opened in 1976.

On 1 May 1986, a few days after the Chernobyl nuclear accident, Soviet authorities held a traditional May Day parade on Khreshchatyk, to "calm people" and "prevent panic" caused by the disaster. Thousands of Kyivans, including many children, were exposed to dangerous doses of radiation.

In the late 1980s, the porch of the Central Post Office building partially collapsed during heavy rain, killing a dozen people and injuring some. The porch was rebuilt in the following years according to its original design.

On 24 July 1990, the first ceremonial raising of the Ukrainian national flag took place on Khreshchatyk, on the large flagstaff of the Kyiv City Council. Due to its central location, the street became the traditional place for political rallies.

Independent Ukraine

Following the dissolution of the Soviet Union and Ukraine becoming independent, the avenue gained a wider context as the central street of the country. During the late 1990s, a complex reconstruction took place, and most of the buildings were cosmetically cleaned up from elements, structurally upgraded and enhanced with colourful illumination. Modern electronic billboards and screens were also installed.

Starting with the third Independence Day of Ukraine, a military parade through Khreshchatyk has been held irregularly. Since 1994, the Kyiv Parade has been held 18 times out of 28 years.

In 2000–01, Khreshchatyk and Maidan Nezalezhnosti, became the centre of the mass protest campaign known as Ukraine without Kuchma. Allegedly to keep the protesters out, the city Mayor (Oleksandr Omelchenko at that time) ordered a major reconstruction of the street, which led to the significant rebuilding of Maidan Nezalezhnosti, and construction of two large underground shopping malls.

In the winter of 2004, Khreshchatyk and Maidan Nezalezhnosti became the centre of the main public protests of the Orange Revolution. The protesters' main tent encampment was situated in the street, and many Khreshchatyk buildings served as makeshift feeding and warming sites for the protesters, including the City Council House. At its peak, over a million people from all around Ukraine attended the rally. In late 2013 Khreshchatyk also became one of the centres of the Euromaidan protests.

During the 2022 Russian invasion of Ukraine, anti-tank obstacles were placed on Khreshchatyk. Due to the mobilization of Ukrainian forces and further threat of Russian forces shelling civilians, the Kyiv parade was cancelled; instead the burnt remains of numerous Russian military vehicles and artilleries were displayed along Khreshchatyk. It was reported by The Guardian that Russian forces were expecting to be able to parade down Khreshchatyk within three days of the start of the invasion and that some soldiers had been issued ceremonial uniforms for that purpose.

Attractions

Khreshchatyk is a popular attraction for tourists. During weekends and public holidays, the street is closed to road traffic and reserved for pedestrians.

Khreshchatyk contains many up-market stores, cafés, and restaurants.

Points of interest situated along Khreshchatyk are the following (south-west to north-east):
Bessarabska Square, including:
Besarabsky indoor Market (nineteenth century)
"Besarabsky Quarter" (shops and offices complex, partly nineteenth century, includes PinchukArtCentre of contemporary art)
Metrohrad, underground shopping centre
Central Department Store (TsUM)
Kyiv Passage, a small narrow commercial and residential street
City Council Building (Kyivrada)
Maidan Nezalezhnosti, including:
Central Post Office (Poshtamt)
National Musical Academy Concert Hall
Globus underground shopping centre, and the preserved ruins of Medieval Liadski Gate beneath the square
Hotel Ukrayina (previously called Moskva)
European Square ("Yevropeyska Square"), including:
Hotel Dnipro
UNIAN news agency building
Ukrainian House (Ukrayinskyi Dim) conference and exhibitions hall
Kyiv Philharmonic building (nineteenth century)
People's Friendship Arch monument dedicated to the unification of Russia and Ukraine with the signing of the Treaty of Pereyaslav

Khreshchatyk is a traditional setting for outdoor concerts and festivals, and is frequented by street musicians. Major parades and celebrations are held on Kyiv Day (the last Sunday of May), Victory Day (9 May) and Ukrainian Independence Day (24 August). The Khreshchatyk Choir is named after the street.

Significant buildings
No.2 Ukrainian House
No.4 UNIAN building
No.15 Pasazh
No.24 Ministry of Agrarian Policy
No.36 Kyiv City Council/Kyiv City State Administration
No.38 Central Department Store

Streets and Squares
Volodymyr Descent
Hrushevskoho Street
Tryokhsvyatytelska Street
Instytutska Street
Maidan Nezalezhnosti
Architect Horodetsky Street
Prorizna Street
Lyuteranska Street
Khmelnytsky Street

Transportation
Kyiv Metro, both stations of the city's rapid transit system are transferable.
Stations Maidan Nezalezhnosti / Khreschchatyk – transfer ( / )
Stations Teatralna / Zoloti Vorota – transfer ( / )

Music
In the 1980s Alexander Rosenbaum wrote a song dedicated to the street "Khreschatyk" (the song became famous by the chansonnier Mikhail Shufutinsky).
In 1994 Pavlo Zibrov wrote a song to the words Yuri Rybchinsky dedicated to the street "Khreschatyk", which was shot a video clip.
Since 1999, on the street weekly for 20 years, they have been filming the Ukrainian television program "Karaoke on Independence Square".

Gallery

References
Footnotes

Bibliography

External links

The concept of Khreshchatyk architecture after World War II 
Khreshchatyk in Wiki Encyclopedia Kyiv 
19th-century views of Khreshchatyk 
Khreshchatyk was blown up by saboteurs 
An optimistic avenue in Vokrug Sveta (Around the World), November 2005. 
Kyiv and Kreshchatyk: The Paradox of War, in the Ukrainian observer
Khreshchatyk 
Petrova, Olga. Khreshchatyk, the history of the main street in Zerkalo Nedeli, 13–19 September 1997
Kurovsky, G. and V. Tovbych. "Khreshchatyk, the dry bed of the future river" in Zerkalo Nedeli, 13–19 January 2001. Available in Russian and Ukrainian
Photos of Kreschatik . 

Khreshchatyk in Pechersk Raion 

Khreshchatyk
Streets in Kyiv
Shopping districts and streets in Ukraine
Shevchenkivskyi District, Kyiv
Pecherskyi District